Rodrigo Díaz (born 31 August 1988) is a Chilean handball player for the Chilean national team. He is also a well known Medal of Honor Allied Assault player, who won his first Chilean National Championship in 2008.

In recent years, Rodrigo has been dedicated to return to the competitive stages in the First Person Shooter (FPS) games, making the new FPS from Riot Games, Valorant, his target. Although he has not become a pro yet, Rodrigo Díaz seems to be on his way to professionalism and pretends to be in the competitive scene rather sooner than later by the hand of his new coach XiNasTy.

References

1988 births
Living people
Chilean male handball players
Pan American Games medalists in handball
Pan American Games bronze medalists for Chile
Handball players at the 2011 Pan American Games
Medalists at the 2011 Pan American Games
20th-century Chilean people
21st-century Chilean people